was a professional wrestling event promoted by World Wonder Ring Stardom. It took place on October 9, 2021, in Osaka at the Osaka-jō Hall with a limited attendance due in part to the ongoing COVID-19 pandemic at the time. The pay-per-view marked the last event under the "10th Anniversary" tagline.

Storylines
The show featured eight professional wrestling matches that resulted from scripted storylines, where wrestlers portrayed villains, heroes, or less distinguishable characters in the scripted events that built tension and culminated in a wrestling match or series of matches. The pay-per-view will portrait the official return to professional wrestling of Hazuki who retired back in 2019. It will also host the first joshi puroresu event in the Osaka-jō Hall since 1995.

On September 28, Stardom held the event's press conference which they broadcast live on their YouTube channel. Waka Tsukiyama requested Tam Nakano and the other Cosmic Angels members to join their unit which they accepted. It was also confirmed that Chigusa Nagayo will join the commentary team. Originally Syuri was scheduled to defend the SWA World Championship and World of Stardom Championship challenge rights certificate against Konami in a UWF Rules match, Konami was diagnosed with acute enteritis on October 8 and the match was cancelled. Syuri joined the commentary team instead.

Moments after winning the Future of Stardom Championship from Unagi Sayaka with help from Rina who intervened in the match, Ruaka received a title challenge from Lady C. Syuri nominated AZM as the next challenger for the SWA World Championship, Unagi Sayaka challenged Tam Nakano for the Wonder of Stardom Championship and Hazuki announced she will form a tag team with Stars member Koguma in the 2021 Goddesses of Stardom Tag League.

After Hayashishita successfully defended her World of Stardom Championship against Takumi Iroha in the main event, Hazuki and Maika came to the ring to challenge her for a title match. Syuri also stepped up to remind the latter two that she is the rightful challenger for the red belt.

Results

Notes

References

External links
 Page Stardom World

2021 in professional wrestling
World Wonder Ring Stardom shows
Professional wrestling in Osaka
Grand finals